Capizzi is a surname. Notable people with the surname include:

Benedetto Capizzi (born 1944), Italian mobster
Bill Capizzi (1937–2007), American voice actor
Duane Capizzi, American writer and television producer
Jason Capizzi (born 1983), American football player